Josef Přibyl (born 1 March 1904, date of death unknown) was a Czech wrestler. He competed in the men's Greco-Roman middleweight at the 1936 Summer Olympics.

References

1904 births
Year of death missing
Czech male sport wrestlers
Olympic wrestlers of Czechoslovakia
Wrestlers at the 1936 Summer Olympics
Place of birth missing